Hartmannshof station is a railway station in the Hartmannshof district of the municipality of Pommelsbrunn, located in the Nürnberger Land district in Middle Franconia, Germany. It is located on the Nuremberg–Schwandorf line of Deutsche Bahn.

References

Nuremberg S-Bahn stations
Railway stations in Bavaria
Railway stations in Germany opened in 1858
1858 establishments in Bavaria
Buildings and structures in Nürnberger Land